Production (and consumption) of agricultural plant commodities has a diverse geographical distribution. Along with climate and corresponding types of vegetation, the economy of a nation also influences the level of agricultural production. Production of some products is highly concentrated in a few countries, China, the leading producer of wheat and ramie in 2013, produces 6% of the world's ramie fiber but only 17% of the world's wheat. Products with more evenly distributed production see more frequent changes in the ranking of the top producers.

The major agricultural products can be broadly categorised into foods, fibers, fuels, and raw materials.

Produce types

Cereal
, FAOSTAT, Food Agriculture Organization of the United Nations:

Vegetables
, FAOSTAT, Food and Agriculture Organization of the United Nations:

Fruits
, FAOSTAT, Food and Agriculture Organization of the United Nations:

Dairy
, FAOSTAT, Food and Agriculture Organization of the United Nations

Drinks
, FAOSTAT, Food and Agriculture Organization of the United Nations

Meat
, FAOSTAT, Food and Agriculture Organization of the United Nations

Nuts
, FAOSTAT, Food and Agriculture Organization of the United Nations

Spices
, FAOSTAT, Food and Agriculture Organization of the United Nations

Others
, FAOSTAT, Food and Agriculture Organization of the United Nations

Non-food products

Fibers
, FAOSTAT, Food and Agriculture Organization of the United Nations.

Forest products
, FAOSTAT, Food and Agriculture Organization of the United Nations

1Wood fuel includes all wood for fuel as firewood, wood pellets, and charcoal
2Sawnwood includes all sawn wood, dimensional lumber
3Wood-based panel includes all plywood, particleboard, fiberboard and veneer sheets
4Paper and Paperboard includes all paper, sanitary paper, and packaging materials 
5Dissolving wood pulp includes cellulose extracted from wood for making synthetic fibres, cellulose plastic materials, lacquers and explosives

References

External links
 Agricultural Production Domain

Agricultural production
Economy-related lists of superlatives
Largest Producing